Khaled al-Hassan ( also known as Abu Said ) (1928-1994) was an early adviser of Yasser Arafat, PLO leader and a founder of the Palestinian political and militant organization Fatah. Khaled was the older brother of Hani al-Hassan.

Early life
Al-Hassan was born in Haifa in 1928. He and his family lived there until they were exiled as refugees after Israel's capture of the city in the 1948 Arab-Israeli War, which he participated in on the side of Palestinian Arab forces. His family settled in Sidon, Lebanon, but he left for Egypt. He was briefly detained in Egypt "just for being Palestinian" according to him. After being released, he reunited with his family in Lebanon where he lived briefly.

In 1949 he formed the short-lasing commando group Tahrir Filastin. A year later he moved to Syria. During this time, al-Hassan worked as a teacher in Damascus and he helped found the Islamic Liberation Party in 1952. Syrian authorities threatened to arrest him that year for attempting to set up another Palestinian commando group, but he left to Kuwait. There, he worked as a civil servant, typist, and later as Secretary-General of the Municipal Council Board in the country until 1967. He was awarded Kuwaiti citizenship in the mid-1950s.

Fatah and PLO activism
Al-Hassan was one of the original founders of Fatah and in Kuwait, he managed to establish a network of Palestinian activists. In 1962, al-Hassan, Yasser Arafat, Khalil al-Wazir and Salah Khalaf established a magazine called Filastuna, Nida' al-Hayat ("Palestine, Our Call to Life"). According to al-Hassan, the "Kuwaiti Fatah group" was known before the Fatah groups in Europe, Qatar, Saudi Arabia, Gaza and Iraq because of the magazine which was based in Tripoli, Lebanon. Fatah had formed a Central Committee which became the main body of the movement and of the ten members, Hassan was one of them.

In 1968, al-Hassan was elected to the Palestine Liberation Organization Executive Committee (PLO-EC) after Fatah took control of the Palestine Liberation Organization (PLO) in 1968. Early that year, al-Hassan persuaded Saudi King Faisal to enforce the "liberation tax" which required Palestinians in that country to pay a percentage of their income to the PLO. This, in turn, supplied the PLO with 60 million riyal yearly. Also, in that year, he spoke to the Egyptian Foreign Minister Mahmoud Riyad and Mohammad Hassanein Heykal on behalf of Gamal Abdel Nasser in order to familiarize him with Fatah and its armed branch al-Assifa.

From 1973, until his death, al-Hassan was chairman of the Foreign Relations Committee of the Palestinian National Council and was thus considered the first "foreign minister of the PLO". After the Yom Kippur War in 1973, he argued that the "Palestinian struggle" could continue with a state in the Palestinian territories occupied by Israel and he wrote up an unofficial five-point proposal in April–May 1980, advocating Israel’s withdrawal from the territories, the deployment of United Nations forces, and work on arrangements for the creation of a Palestinian state in the territories.

Later life and death

Al-Hassan called election of a Palestinian provisional government capable of ending the PLO’s isolation after the First Intifada in 1991. He settled in Rabat, Morocco that year after being expelled, along with hundreds of thousands of other Palestinians, from Kuwait during the Gulf War, in which the PLO aligned itself with Saddam Hussein's Iraq.

Al-Hassan authored Grasping the Nettle of Peace in 1992, advocating a Swiss-style confederation in which citizens from Israel, the Palestinian territories and Jordan would vote according to their canton, hence no recognition of the Arab land captured by Israel in 1948. He opposed the way Arafat and PLO officials handled the Oslo Agreements.

Al-Hassan suffered from cancer since 1991 and died from it on October 8, 1994 at the age of 66.

References

Bibliography
Cobban, Helena. (1984). The Palestinian Liberation Organisation: People, Power, and Politics Cambridge University Press.
Grasping The Nettle Of Peace (2001). http://www.barnesandnoble.com/w/grasping-the-nettle-of-peace-khaled-al-hassan/1021107082 Saqi Books.

1928 births
1994 deaths
Fatah members
People from Haifa
Central Committee of Fatah members